Sueños en tránsito is the third studio album by recording artist Nicole and her final album with Sony Music. It was released by RCA Records on 19 June 1997. Production was entirely handled by Gustavo Cerati, and represented the most radical change in Nicole's musical style, shifting from her traditional Latin pop and pop rock influences, to exploring electronic, trip hop, and alternative rock styles.

The album received critical acclaim from critics, who praised its innovative style, Cerati's production, and Nicole's vocals and songwriting.

Track listing 
All tracks produced by Gustavo Cerati, unless otherwise noted.

Personnel 
Taken and adapted from Allmusic.com.

Nicole - Art Direction, Composer, Performer, Lyricist, Producer, Primary Artist, Vocals (Lead and background)
Marcelo Aedo - Bassist 
Gustavo Cerati - Producer, Composer, Guitar, Vocals (Background) 
Ray Staff - Mastering
Andres Sylleros - Arranger, Composer, Keyboards
Ernesto Medina - Design
Lloyd Gardiner - Mixing
Guillermo Ugarte - Composer, Keyboard Programming, Sample Programming
Andre Baeza - Drums
Emilo Garcia - Guitar
Eduardo Bergallo - Engineer, Mixing
Joaquin Garcia - Assistant Engineer
Sebastian Piga - Composer, Flute, Guitar, Vocals (Background)
Mario Salazar - Photography
Gideon Mendel - Photography

References

External links 

1997 albums
Trip hop albums by Chilean artists
Nicole (Chilean singer) albums

pt:Nicole (cantora chilena)#Discografia